Anton "Toni" Mang (born 29 September 1949 in Inning (Starnberg) at the Ammersee) is a former five-time world champion in Grand Prix motorcycle racing from Germany.

Early life
When he was 11 he had his first experience with motorcycles on the DKW RT 125, but soon afterwards he chose skibobbing as his favored sport. He was successful at this sport, winning the German National Championship as well as the Junior European Championship in skibobbing at the age of 16.

Still, motorsports kept pulling at him and he took part in a 50cc race on a Kreidler two years later though he had to pull out of the race due to mechanical difficulties.

Professional racing
In 1970 Mang joined the reigning 125cc world champion Dieter Braun's team as his mechanic. Together with Sepp Schloegl and Alfons Zender Mang, he developed the "Schloegl Mang Zender" (SMZ 250). With this machine, he took part in a race on an airfield in Augsburg and claimed his first victory. In 1975 he won the German Championship on 350cc Yamaha. Also in 1975 he competed in his first Grand Prix at the Austrian round of the world championship.

His first Grand Prix victory came at the 1976 125cc German Grand Prix at the 22.8 km Nordschleife Circuit at Nürburgring on a 125cc Morbidelli. His success earned him a ride with Kawasaki riding Kawasaki KR250 and KR350s for the 1978 season. In 1980  he became World Champion in the 250 cc class and runner-up in the 350cc class behind Jon Ekerold. In 1981  he won both the 250cc and 350cc World Championships and became German Sportsman of the Year. In 1982, he became the last ever 350cc World Champion as the class was abolished at the end of the year. He fell just one point short of defending his 250cc championship, despite winning five races.

In 1983 Mang moved up to the 500 cc class, but a bad injury sustained in a skiing accident at the start of the season preventing him from competing until the middle of August. He failed to finish above 10th place in any of the races. In the subsequent year, 1984, Mang returned to the 250 cc class and finished 5th in the World Championship on a private 250 cc Yamaha. In 1985, a strong performance by Freddie Spencer left him in second place in the championship. 1986 saw him finish in 4th place in the series. Moreover, the fruitful collaboration with his chief mechanic and friend Sepp Schloegl came to an end.

In 1987 he became 250cc World Champion for the third time with 8 consecutive victories. At 38, he was the oldest 250 cc World Champion in the history of Grand Prix motorcycle racing history. He started the 1988 season with a victory, but injuries sustained in a bad crash in the Rijeka race in Yugoslavia forced him into retirement. Mang retired with a lifetime total of 42 GP wins. The FIM named him a Grand Prix "Legend" in 2001.

Like Angel Nieto on lighter 50cc and 125cc machinery, Mang specialized in medium-sized 250cc and 350cc bikes, winning all 5 of his championships on medium bikes.

Motorcycle Grand Prix results
Points system from 1968 to 1987

Points system from 1988 to 1992

(key) (Races in bold indicate pole position; races in italics indicate fastest lap)

References

German motorcycle racers
125cc World Championship riders
250cc World Championship riders
350cc World Championship riders
500cc World Championship riders
Sportspeople from Augsburg
1949 births
Living people
250cc World Riders' Champions
350cc World Riders' Champions